Netmizaaggamig Nishnaabeg (formerly Pic Mobert First Nation) is an Ojibwe First Nation band government in Northwestern Ontario, Canada. 

The community has year-round road access. 

As of October 2021, Netmizaaggamig Nishnaabeg had a registered population of 1064 members, 352 of whom live on-reserve.

Governance
Netmizaaggamig Nishnaabeg is currently led by Chief Johanna Desmoulin, and is governed by a Chi-Naaknigewin (Community Constitution) approved in 2016. The Nation is a member of the Nokiiwin Tribal Council and of the Anishinabek Nation.

History
The land that now encompasses Netmizaaggamig Nishnaabeg has been inhabited by the Anishinabek since at least 1876. The first Hudson's Bay Company post in the area was established in 1850, and the Anishinabek were noted to have participated in the fur trade there. In the 1940s, eight prisoner of war camps were established near the reserve.

References

External links
Netmizaaggamig Nishnaabeg official website 
First Nation Detail

First Nations governments in Ontario
Ojibwe in Canada